Flavio Chigi is the name of three cardinals:

Flavio Chigi (1631–1693)
Flavio Chigi (1711–1771)